Pseudothyretes is a genus of moth in the subfamily Arctiinae.

Species
Pseudothyretes carnea (Hampson, 1898)
Pseudothyretes erubescens (Hampson, 1901)
Pseudothyretes kamitugensis (Dufrane, 1945)
Pseudothyretes mariae Dufrane, 1945
Pseudothyretes nigrita (Kiriakoff, 1961)
Pseudothyretes perpusilla (Walker, 1856)
Pseudothyretes rubicundula (Strand, 1912)

References

External links
Natural History Museum Lepidoptera generic names catalog

Syntomini